Kazan was a Hansa A Type cargo ship which was built as Elmenhorst in 1943 by Van Vliet & Co, Hardinxveld, Netherlands for Godeffroy & Co, Hamburg, Germany. She was seized as a prize of war in 1945, passing to the Ministry of War Transport and renamed Empire Galleon. She was allocated to the Soviet Union in 1946 and was renamed Kazan. She served until 1973 when she was scrapped.

Description

The ship was propelled by a compound steam engine, which had two cylinders of 42 cm (16 inches) and two cylinders of 90 cm (35 inches) diameter by 90 cm (35 inches) stroke. The engine was built by Waggon- und Maschinenbau GmbH, Görlitz.

History
Elmenhorst was a Hansa A Type cargo ship built in 1943 as yard number 502 by Van Vliet & Co., Hardinxveld, Netherlands for Godeffroy & Co, Hamburg. She was launched on 22 December and completed in April 1945. Her port of registry was Hamburg.

In May 1945, Elmenhorst was seized as a prize of war at Kiel. She was passed to the Ministry of War Transport. She was renamed Empire Galleon. The Code Letters GJKL and United Kingdom Official Number 180595 were allocated. Her port of registry was London and she was operated under the management of the Kindiesel Shipping Co. Ltd, Greenock.

In 1947 Empire Galleon was allocated to the Soviet Union and was renamed Kazan. With their introduction in the 1960s, Kazan was allocated the IMO Number 6718996. She served until 1973 when she was scrapped.

References

1943 ships
Ships built in the Netherlands
World War II merchant ships of Germany
Steamships of Germany
Empire ships
Ministry of War Transport ships
Merchant ships of the United Kingdom
Steamships of the United Kingdom
Merchant ships of the Soviet Union
Steamships of the Soviet Union